Redcliffe Bridge is a traffic bridge which carries Tonkin Highway across the Swan River between the Perth suburbs of Ascot and Bayswater. It is named after Redcliffe, which is a nearby suburb.

Designed by Maunsell & Partners and built by Thiess Contractors,
construction of the bridge started in 1986. The bridge was constructed using an incremental launch technique, and cost A$15 million to complete.
It was officially opened on 16 April 1988.
The structure of the bridge is that of a hollow box girder, with the outer sides of the deck supported by special Y-beams.

References

External links 
 

Road bridges in Perth, Western Australia
Swan River (Western Australia)
Redcliffe, Western Australia
Bayswater, Western Australia
Ascot, Western Australia